Tiruvarur Vaidyanathan (திருவாரூர் வைத்தியநாதன்) is a mridangam artist born 11 May 1963 in Tiruvarur, India to a family of mridangam artists.

Awards and honors
South Asian Arts and cultural Organisation's Vadyari award for promoting Indian Carnatic Music in Canada.
Sangeet Natal Akademi Award 2018

Controversy
In the 2018 music season, Madras Music Academy dropped Vaidyanathan from its programming due to allegations of sexual harassment against him.

References

1963 births
Living people
Indian male classical musicians
Mridangam players
People from Tiruvarur district
Musicians from Tamil Nadu
Recipients of the Sangeet Natak Akademi Award